Mayor of Portland may refer to:

Mayor of Portland, Oregon
Mayor of Portland, Maine